Ash Christian (born January 16, 1985, in Paris, Texas – d. August 14, 2020 in Puerto Vallarta, Mexico) was an American actor and film director and producer. He was the founder of Cranium Entertainment. He wrote, directed and produced Fat Girls in 2006, for which he won Outfest's Award for Outstanding Emerging Talent, and Mangus! in 2011.

Biography 
At 14, Ash Christian started to write and direct short films. At 16, he moved to Los Angeles to start an acting career. He wrote the his first feature film, Fat Girls, which he starred in and directed at the age of 19. The movie won the Outstanding Emerging Talent Award at L.A. Outfest 2006 after it premiered at the Tribeca Film Festival.

Ash Christian co-produced Nate & Margaret in 2012, Hurricane Bianca in 2016, Social Animals and 1985 in 2018, Burn in 2019, and Chick Fight.

He acted in television series, including The Good Fight, The Good Wife, and Law and Order.

He was also a producer for the Broadway musical Next to Normal.

Christian died of a heart attack in his sleep while on vacation in Puerto Vallarta, Mexico.

Filmography

Film

Television

References

External links

1985 births
2020 deaths
Male actors from Texas
American film producers
American male television actors
American gay actors
People from Paris, Texas
American film directors
20th-century American male actors
21st-century American male actors
21st-century American LGBT people